Gazipaşa-Alanya Airport  is an airport in service in the Gazipaşa, Anamur, Alanya, Kargıcak, Kestel, Payallar, Avsallar, Okurcalar, Kızılağaç and Side areas of the Antalya Province in Turkey. The airport opened for domestic flights in July 2010 with daily flights from Istanbul with Borajet. International flights began in the 2011 holiday season, with flights from Amsterdam. The new airport is only 30 minutes by road from Alanya compared to a travel time of two hours between Alanya and Antalya Airport, which was previously the nearest airport, 120 km away.

Construction 
The airport was finished in 1999, but it was not opened for operation. Talks were held in 2006, with reports commissioned by the national government, local government, and tourist organizations to commence operation.  Finally, the decision was made clear in 2007 after multiple bids had been submitted to award operation to Tepe Akfen Ventures Airports Holding (TAV), which paid $50,000 a year, and a 65% share in profit for the right to operate the airport for 25 years. TAV then updated and expanded the airport, including lengthening the runway to 2,350m in order to handle international operations, among other things.

Facilities 
The airport has an annual passenger capacity of 1,500,000 passengers, a terminal area of 6,700 square meters and a parking lot with a capacity of 105 vehicles.

Airlines and destinations
The following airlines operate regular scheduled and charter flights at Gazipaşa-Alanya Airport:

Traffic statistics

References

External links

Airports in Turkey
Alanya
Buildings and structures in Antalya Province
Transport in Antalya Province